The March 731 was a Formula One racing car designed by Robin Herd of March Engineering for the  season which saw continued use through .

References 

March Formula One cars
Open wheel racing cars